Matti Tammelin (6 September 1926 – 16 February 1998) was a Finnish boxer. He competed in the men's featherweight event at the 1948 Summer Olympics.

References

1926 births
1998 deaths
Finnish male boxers
Olympic boxers of Finland
Boxers at the 1948 Summer Olympics
Sportspeople from Helsinki
Featherweight boxers